Elections to Southend-on-Sea Borough Council took place on 3 May 2018. This was on the same day as other local elections across the United Kingdom.

Composition
Directly after the 2016 election the composition of the council was:

Prior to the election the composition of the council was:

After the election, the composition of the council was:

Result Summary

Ward results

Belfairs

No Independent candidate as previous (−41.6).

Blenheim Park

No Green candidate as previous (−4.2).

Chalkwell

No UKIP (−10.5) or Green (−5.8) candidates as previous.

Eastwood Park 

No UKIP (−26.8) or Green (−2.1) candidates as previous.

Kursaal 

No UKIP (−19.0) or Green (−8.4) candidates as previous.

Leigh 

No UKIP candidate as previous (−8.5).

Milton 

No UKIP candidate as previous (−13.2).

Prittlewell 

No UKIP (−18.8) or Independent (−9.3) candidates as previous.

Shoeburyness 

No UKIP (−12.3), Green (−2.3) or two Independent candidates (−29.0, −21.0) as previous.

Independent vote share change compared to 2014 election.

Southchurch 

No Independent (−32.6) or UKIP (−14.9) candidates as previous.

St. Laurence 

No UKIP (−20.3) or Green (−3.0) candidates as previous.

St. Luke's 

No UKIP (−15.6) candidates as previous.

Thorpe 

No Independent (−63.1), UKIP (−10.0) or Green (−2.8) candidates as previous.

Independent vote share change compared to 2014 election.

Victoria 

No UKIP (−19.8) or Liberal Democrat (−3.7) candidates as previous.

West Leigh 

No Independent (−4.0) or Green (−3.3) candidates as previous.

West Shoebury 

No UKIP (−15.3) or Green (−2.0) candidates as previous.

Westborough 

No Independent (−22.1) or UKIP (−12.9) candidates as previous.

References

2018
2018 English local elections